Fudbalski klub Mladost Velika Obarska is a football club from the village of Velika Obarska, in Republika Srpska, Bosnia and Herzegovina.

History
The club was formed 1948 and competed mostly in lower leagues within Yugoslav league system. Since the break-up of Yugoslavia it played in the leagues of Republika Srpska.  In the season 2012–13, Mladost finished top of the First League of the Republika Srpska 7 points in front of Sloboda Mrkonjić Grad and Kozara Gradiška, and were promoted to the 2013–14 Premier League of Bosnia and Herzegovina. Three years later, due to difficult financial reasons, Mladost had to descend in the summer 2017 from the fourth tier Regional League of Republika Srpska - East in the seventh and last Bosnian league Second Municipal League Bijeljina - East.

Stadium
Mladost VO plays at Stadion Velika Obarska with a capacity of 1,000 spectators.

Honours
First League of the Republika Srpska: 1
2012–13

Squad

Coaching staff

Managers
 Đojo Milovanović
 Miroslav Milanović (????–Oct 3, 2013)
 Dušan Jevrić (Oct 3, 2013 – Jan 19,2015)
 Slavoljub Bubanja (Jan 19, 2015–)

References

FK Mladost Velika Obarska
Football clubs in Bosnia and Herzegovina
FK Mladost Velika Obarska